The 2019–20 Temple Owls men's basketball team represents Temple University during the 2019–20 NCAA Division I men's basketball season. The Owls, led by first-year head coach Aaron McKie, play their home games at the Liacouras Center in Philadelphia as a member of the American Athletic Conference.

Previous season
The Owls finished the 2018–19 season 23–10, 13–5 in AAC play to finish in third place. As the 3-seed in the AAC tournament, the Owls lost to sixth-seeded Wichita State in the first round. They received a bid to the NCAA tournament as an 11th seed, where they lost to Belmont in the First Four.

The season was head coach Fran Dunphy's final season as Temple head coach. The school announced on April 13, 2018, that he would step down at the end of the 2019 season and that top assistant and former Owls star Aaron McKie would succeed him.

Offseason

Departures

Incoming transfers

2019 recruiting class

Preseason
In the preseason, Temple was picked to finish seventh in the American Athletic Conference by the league coaches. Senior guard Quinton Rose was picked to the preseason First Team All-AAC while junior guard Nate Pierre-Louis was picked to the preseason Second Team All-AAC.

Roster

Preseason - Damian Dunn suffered a foot injury. He would appear in only one game during the season due to the injury.

Schedule and results

|-
!colspan=12 style=|Regular season

|-
!colspan=12 style=| AAC tournament

1.Cancelled due to the Coronavirus Pandemic

Awards and honors

American Athletic Conference honors

All-AAC Second Team
Quinton Rose

Player of the Week
Week 1: Nate Pierre-Louis
Week 4: Quinton Rose

Source

References

Temple Owls men's basketball seasons
Temple
Temple
Temple